The Masked Rider is the primary mascot of Texas Tech University.

Masked Rider or The Masked Rider may also refer to:

Fictional characters
 The Masked Rider, from the 1912 novel Riders of the Purple Sage by Zane Grey and the 1918 film adaptation
 Masked Rider, from the 1928 American film The Sunset Legion
 Masked Rider, from the 2009 French-British-Czech film Solomon Kane
 Masked Rider, from Standard Comics

Film and television
 The Masked Rider (1916 film), an American film directed by Fred J. Balshofer
 The Masked Rider (1919 film), an American film featuring Boris Karloff
 The Masked Rider (1941 film), an American Western film directed by Ford Beebe
 Kamen Rider or Masked Rider, a 1971–1983 Japanese television series
 Masked Rider (TV series), a 1995–1996 American series adapted from the 1988–1989 Japanese series Kamen Rider Black RX
 "The Masked Rider" (The Lone Ranger), a 1949 television episode

Literature
 The Masked Rider: Cycling in West Africa, a 1996 book by Neil Peart
 Masked Rider, a 1953 Harlequin Romance novel by Will Garth

Video games
 The Masked Rider: Kamen Rider ZO, a 1994 video game